Jules Comby (28 April 1853, in Arnac-Pompadour – 18 March 1947) was a French pediatrician. 

The eponymous "Comby's sign" is named after him, which is an early indication of measles characterized by thin whitish patches on the gums and buccal mucous membrane.

Written works 
With Antoine Marfan (1858–1942) and Jacques-Joseph Grancher (1843–1907), he published the influential Traité des maladies de l’enfance (Treatise of the Diseases of Childhood). Other publications and translated works of his include:

 Étiologie et prophylaxie du rachitisme, 1885 - Etiology and prevention of rachitis.
 Étiologie et prophylaxie de la scrofule dans la première enfance, 1885 - Etiology and prevention of scrofula in infancy.
 Le rachitisme, 1892, in Spanish as El raquitismo 1895 - Rachitis.
 Les oreillons, 1893 - The mumps.
 Formulaire thérapeutique et prophylaxie des maladies des enfants, 1894 - Therapeutic formulary and prevention involving diseases of children. 
 L'empyème pulsatile 1895 - Pulsatile empyema.
 Paralysies obstétricales des nouveau-nés, 1897 - Obstetrical paralyses of the new-born.
 "Diseases of children", London : Sampson Low, Marston, 1897
 "Diseases of children: excluding infectious diseases and rachitis"; New York: 1897
 Tratado de las enfermedades de la Infancia, two editions published between 1899 and 1910 in Spanish.
 Tratado de terapeutica clinica y profilaxia de las enfermedades de los ninos, published in Spanish (1905).
 Cent cinquante consultations médicales pour les maladies des enfants, 1910 - 150 medical consultations involving illnesses of children. 
 Deux cents consultations médicales pour les maladies des enfants, 1915 - 200 medical consultations involving illnesses of children.

References 

1853 births
1947 deaths
French pediatricians
People from Corrèze